Burnie United Football Club is a soccer club which represents Burnie in the Tasmanian Northern Championship. The club also fields teams in all junior divisions, as well as women's teams. Burnie United play their home games at Montello, in Burnie, Tasmania. Burnie United was formed out of a unification in 1978 between Burnie Spartans and Burnie Rovers, both of which clubs played at Montello.

Seasons

Honours
Northern Championship: 1978; 1979; 1996; 1997

External links
Burnie United – Official Website

Association football clubs established in 1978
Soccer clubs in Tasmania
Sport in Burnie, Tasmania
1978 establishments in Australia